is a Japanese professional footballer who plays as a midfielder for 2. Bundesliga club Arminia Bielefeld.

Club career

Kyoto Sanga
Okugawa joined Kyoto Sanga FC's youth setup in 2009 from local youth side Ayano Boys Club. He progressed through the youth system of the Sanga and in September 2014, he signed a professional contract with them. He made his first team debut in the J2 League on 5 May 2015, in a 1–1 draw against FC Gifu, replacing Takumi Miyayoshi after 59 minutes.

Red Bull Salzburg
On 5 June 2015, Red Bull Salzburg announced the signing of Okugawa from Kyoto Sanga, for an undisclosed fee rumoured to be in the region of ¥100 million. He would be developed for the first team via Liefering.

On 31 August 2018, it was announced that Okugawa would join Holstein Kiel on loan until the end of 2018–19 season.

On 3 November 2020, Okugawa scored his first UEFA Champions League goal in a 6–2 defeat against Bayern Munich in the 2020–21 season.

Okugawa joined German club Arminia Bielefeld on loan for the remainder of the season on 31 January 2021. The deal contained an option to buy.

Arminia Bielefeld
On 26 July 2021, it was announced by Arminia Bielefeld that Okugawa has signed a permanent contract with the club until the summer of 2024. In his first season after signing, he scored in four Bundesliga matches in a row between matchdays 16 and 19.

Career statistics

Honours 
Red Bull Salzburg
 Austrian Bundesliga: 2019–20
 Austrian Cup: 2019–20

References

External links

 
 

1996 births
Living people
Association football people from Shiga Prefecture
Association football midfielders
Japanese footballers
Japanese expatriate footballers
Japanese expatriate sportspeople in Austria
Expatriate footballers in Austria
J2 League players
J3 League players
Kyoto Sanga FC players
J.League U-22 Selection players
FC Liefering players
SV Mattersburg players
FC Red Bull Salzburg players
Holstein Kiel players
Arminia Bielefeld players
Japan youth international footballers
Japan under-20 international footballers
2. Liga (Austria) players
2. Bundesliga players
Austrian Football Bundesliga players
Japanese expatriate sportspeople in Germany
Expatriate footballers in Germany